William Dalton Buck (born 30 September 1946) is an English retired cricketer who was a right-handed batsman who bowled medium pace.

Buck was educated at Clayesmore School. He represented both Hampshire and Somerset in 1969. He made his first-class debut, playing for Somerset in June 1969, against the touring West Indians. During this match he took his only wickets in first-class cricket, dismissing Test cricketers Roy Fredericks and Joey Carew. In August 1969 Buck represented Hampshire against the touring New Zealanders. He failed to take a wicket in the match and this marked his last appearance in first-class cricket.

References

External links
 
 Bill Buck at CricketArchive

1946 births
Living people
Cricketers from Southampton
English cricketers
Somerset cricketers
Hampshire cricketers
People educated at Clayesmore School